Brent Scott can mean: 

 Brent Scott (basketball), retired American professional basketball player
 Brent W. Scott, retired United States Navy rear admiral and chaplain
 Brent Scott, also known as PD, founder of the pornographic website Insex